In mathematics, Lehmer's totient problem asks whether there is any composite number n such that Euler's totient function φ(n) divides n − 1.  This is an unsolved problem.

It is known that φ(n) = n − 1 if and only if n is prime. So for every prime number n, we have φ(n) = n − 1 and thus in particular φ(n) divides n − 1.  D. H. Lehmer conjectured in 1932 that there are no composite numbers with this property.

History
 Lehmer showed that if any composite solution n exists, it must be odd, square-free, and divisible by at least seven distinct primes (i.e. ω(n) ≥ 7). Such a number must also be a Carmichael number.
 In 1980, Cohen and Hagis proved that, for any solution n to the problem,  n > 1020 and ω(n) ≥  14.
 In 1988, Hagis showed that if 3 divides any solution n, then n > 10 and ω(n) ≥ . This was subsequently improved by Burcsi, Czirbusz, and Farkas, who showed that if 3 divides any solution n, then n > 10 and ω(n) ≥  .

References

 
 
 
 
 

 
 

Conjectures
Unsolved problems in number theory
Multiplicative functions